William Ratcliffe VC MM (18 January 1884 – 26 March 1963) was an English recipient of the Victoria Cross, the highest and most prestigious award for gallantry in the face of the enemy that can be awarded to British and Commonwealth forces.

Biography

William Ratcliffe was born on 18 January 1884 at 38 Newhall Street, Liverpool, Lancashire. His parents were William Ratcliffe and Mary Ann Kelly. He was baptised at St Vincent de Paul Roman Catholic Church on 21 January 1884. His birth was not registered by his mother until 31 March 1884. His mother gave his month of birth as February in order to avoid late registration of the birth. He was educated at St. Vincent de Paul's Roman Catholic School in Norfolk Street, Liverpool. 

Ratcliffe worked on the Liverpool docks briefly after leaving school, then joined the British Army at the age of 17 and served in South Africa during the Second Boer War and in India. He initially served with the South Lancashire Regiment, 3rd Battalion and later transferred to the Durham Light Infantry. By 1914 he had left the army and was back working as a docker in Liverpool. When war was declared he quickly re-joined, enlisting with the South Lancashire Regiment in August 1914. He won the Military Medal and Victoria Cross at the Battle of Messines (1917).

In 1929 Victoria Cross winners were invited, by the Prince of Wales, to attend a dinner at the Royal Gallery of the House of Lords. Ratcliffe was reluctant to attend due to lack of funds. After a newspaper story was published about him, the people of Liverpool raised money to kit him out in a new suit suitable for the occasion. He worked on the Liverpool Docks until an industrial accident forced him into early retirement in the 1940s. In 1956 he attended the Centennial of the institution of the Victoria Cross in London's Hyde Park, where the living holders were reviewed by Queen Elizabeth II. On this occasion the Victoria Cross Association paid for a new suit and accommodation.

Details
Ratcliffe was 33 years old, and a private in the 2nd Battalion, the South Lancashire Regiment, British Army during the First World War when the following deed took place during the Battle of Messines for which he was awarded the VC.

On 14 June 1917 at Messines, Belgium, after an enemy trench had been captured, Private Ratcliffe located an enemy machine-gun which was firing on his comrades from the rear, and single-handed, on his own initiative, immediately rushed the machine-gun position and bayoneted the crew. He then brought the gun back into action in the front line. Private Ratcliffe had displayed similar gallantry and resource on previous occasions.

The medal
His VC is on loan to the Imperial War Museum in Lambeth Road, London.

References

External links
Echoes of Liverpool The Docker VC
Location of grave and VC medal (Liverpool)
 
Liverpool VCs (James Murphy, Pen and Sword Books, 2008)
 

1884 births
1963 deaths
British World War I recipients of the Victoria Cross
South Lancashire Regiment soldiers
British Army personnel of the Second Boer War
British Army personnel of World War I
Victoria Cross awardees from Liverpool
Recipients of the Military Medal
British Army recipients of the Victoria Cross
Burials in North West England
Durham Light Infantry soldiers